Manoharsinhji Pradyumansinhji Jadeja (18 November 1935 – 27 September 2018) was an Indian nobleman and politician.

Early life 
The eldest son of Pradyumansinhji Lakhajirajsinhji, the 14th Thakore Saheb, Manoharsinhji was born at the Ranjit Vilas Palace in Rajkot. He was educated at Rajkumar College, Rajkot, and at Elphinstone College, Mumbai.  Manoharsinhji had a bachelor of arts honours degree, a bachelor of laws degree.  He was awarded a Master of Laws degree from the University of London.

Cricketing career 
Like his father and grandfather (the 12th Thakore Saheb), Manoharsinhji was a keen cricketer, and made his first-class debut for Saurashtra against Gujarat in the 1955–56 Ranji Trophy, scoring 59 runs in his first innings. Manoharsinhji served as captain of the team from the 1957–58 season onwards, and was a regular in the team until his retirement after the 1963–64 season. Usually playing as a top order batsman, his highest first-class score (and only century) was an innings of 144 runs against Gujarat in December 1957. Overall, Manoharsinhji played 14 first-class matches, scoring 614 runs at an average of 29.23.

Political career 
Standing for the Indian National Congress in the constituency of Rajkot, Manoharsinhji was elected to the Gujarat Legislative Assembly in 1967, and served until 1971. Upon the death of his father in November 1973, he acceded to the title of Thakore Saheb. The title had afforded no extra powers or privileges since Indian independence in 1947, and serves merely as a courtesy, although property attached to the title remains with the Thakore Saheb. Manoharsinhji served two further terms as a member of the Gujarat Legislative Assembly for the Rajkot (I) constituency—from 1980 to 1985 and 1990 to 1995—and occupied a number of positions in cabinet, including Minister for Finance, Minister for Youth Services, and Minister for Health. From 1998, he has served as a vice-president of the Gujarat Pradesh Congress Committee, the state division of the Indian National Congress. Politically, Manoharsinhji is generally known under the name "Manoharsinh Jadeja", deriving from his family's dynastic name.

Personal life 
Manoharsinhji married Mankumari Devi Sahiba, the second daughter of Tej Singh Prabhakar, Maharaja of Alwar, in 1949, and had one son and three daughters.  In November 2010 he purchased the Star of India, a vintage Rolls-Royce car custom-built for his grandfather Dharmendrasinhji Lakhajiraj in 1934.  The car had been outside of the family for 42 years, as a part of Bill Meredith-Owens' Collection and was once the most expensive car in the world.

Death 
Manoharsinhji died at his house at the Ranjit Vilas Palace on 27 September 2018.

References

1935 births
2018 deaths
Indian cricketers
20th-century Indian monarchs
Indian National Congress politicians
Indian sportsperson-politicians
Gujarat MLAs 1980–1985
People from Rajkot
Saurashtra cricketers
Cricketers from Gujarat
State cabinet ministers of Gujarat
Gujarat MLAs 1990–1995
Elphinstone College alumni